Hamid Haji Jafar Zarbaf (born 22 August 1990) is a Dutch footballer who most recently played for Go Ahead Eagles, as a defender.

Career
Zarbaf began his early career in amateur football with SV Helios, Koninklijke UD, CSV Apeldoorn, Rohda Raalte and HHC Hardenberg. He turned professional after signing for Go Ahead Eagles in January 2018. In June 2018, his contract was terminated by mutual consent.

Personal life
Zarbaf is of Iranian heritage.

Career statistics

References

1990 births
Living people
Dutch footballers
Dutch people of Iranian descent
Sportspeople of Iranian descent
CSV Apeldoorn players
Rohda Raalte players
HHC Hardenberg players
Go Ahead Eagles players
Derde Divisie players
Tweede Divisie players
Eerste Divisie players
Association football defenders
Footballers from Deventer